Rossland City was the name of a provincial electoral district in the Canadian province of British Columbia, located in the West Kootenay region.  It is named after the town of Rossland, near Trail, B.C.  It made its first appearance on the hustings in the election of 1903 and lasted only until 1912, after which the revised riding was simply Rossland.

For other current and historical electoral districts in the Kootenay region, please see Kootenay (electoral districts).

Demographics

Electoral history 
Note:  Winners of each election are in bold.

|Liberal
|James Alexander MacDonald
|align="right"|436
|align="right"|55.97%
|align="right"|
|align="right"|unknown
|- bgcolor="white"
!align="right" colspan=3|Total valid votes
!align="right"|779 
!align="right"|100.00%
!align="right"|
|- bgcolor="white"
!align="right" colspan=3|Total rejected ballots
!align="right"|
!align="right"|
!align="right"|
|- bgcolor="white"
!align="right" colspan=3|Turnout
!align="right"|%
!align="right"|
!align="right"|
|- bgcolor="white"
!align="right" colspan=7|1 Parr may have been a Labour candidate although Gosnell labels him a Liberal; he may have campaigned as both.
|}

|Liberal
|James Alexander MacDonald
|align="right"|241
|align="right"|45.90%
|align="right"|
|align="right"|unknown
|- bgcolor="white"
!align="right" colspan=3|Total valid votes
!align="right"|525
!align="right"|100.00%
!align="right"|
|- bgcolor="white"
!align="right" colspan=3|Total rejected ballots
!align="right"|
!align="right"|
!align="right"|
|- bgcolor="white"
!align="right" colspan=3|Turnout
!align="right"|%
!align="right"|
!align="right"|
|}

 
|Liberal
|John M. English
|align="right"|217 
|align="right"|35.34%
|align="right"|
|align="right"|unknown
|- bgcolor="white"
!align="right" colspan=3|Total valid votes
!align="right"|614
!align="right"|100.00%
!align="right"|
|- bgcolor="white"
!align="right" colspan=3|Total rejected ballots
!align="right"|
!align="right"|
!align="right"|
|- bgcolor="white"
!align="right" colspan=3|Turnout
!align="right"|%
!align="right"|
!align="right"|
|}

 
|Liberal
|Louis Denison Taylor
|align="right"|168 
|align="right"|28.05%
|align="right"|
|align="right"|unknown
|- bgcolor="white"
!align="right" colspan=3|Total valid votes
!align="right"|599
!align="right"|100.00%
!align="right"|
|- bgcolor="white"
!align="right" colspan=3|Total rejected ballots
!align="right"|
!align="right"|
!align="right"|
|- bgcolor="white"
!align="right" colspan=3|Turnout
!align="right"|%
!align="right"|
!align="right"|
|}

Redistribution following the 1912 election resulted in the renaming of the riding to Rossland.

Sources 
Elections BC Historical Returns

Former provincial electoral districts of British Columbia
West Kootenay